Mayur Puri is an Indian screenwriter, lyricist, actor and film-maker working in Mumbai. He has written songs, screenplays and dialogue for several movies, including Om Shanti Om (2007) starring Shahrukh Khan directed by Farah Khan, where Mayur also did a cameo appearance (as the wannabe Gujju Director of 'Apahij Pyar'). He wrote dialogue for the Farah Khan film Happy New Year (2014). On 17 November 2014, The Library of the Academy of Motion Picture Arts & Sciences selected the screenplay of Happy New Year for its permanent Core Collection.

Mayur wrote the dialogue for India's first 3D Dance film ABCD: Any Body Can Dance. He also wrote the songs for 'ABCD: Any Body Can Dance'. After the success of 'ABCD: Any Body Can Dance', Mayur wrote dialogue and songs for the second installment of the franchise ABCD: Any Body Can Dance 2.

Mayur recently directed Firdaws (2017), his first short film.

Mayur has aided in the adaptation and translation of American films into Hindi. He has wrote the Hindi translation of Hollywood films and TV series like Mowgli: Legend of the Jungle (2018), Pirates of the Caribbean: Dead Men Tell No Tales (2017), Thor: Ragnarok (2017), Maleficent: Mistress of Evil, The Lion King (2019), Avengers: Endgame (2019), Orange Is The New Black (2013–19), Jojo Rabbit (2019), Spies In Disguise (2019) and Locke and Key (2020)

Early life
Mayur hails from Ahmedabad, Gujarat, where he completed most of his education, including a Master of Arts degree from University School of Languages and an F.Y. Diploma in Dramatics from the Drama Department of Gujarat College (topped the university). He spent his early years writing and directing for local theatre and television, and after 8 years of experience, he moved from Ahmedabad to Mumbai in late 1999 and immediately landed a job with Sanjay Gadhvi, an Indian film director as his Chief Assistant Director. From the year 2000, he started writing screenplay and dialogues for films that he was assisting on. During his first year in Mumbai, he also wrote and acted in lead for a Gujarati play Amastaa Amastaa (2001).

Film career
In 1999, Mayur started in the film industry by assisting Sanjay Gadhvi. They worked on three films together, one of which was Tere Liye, where Mayur was the chief assistant director. Mere Yaar Ki Shaadi Hai (2002) was next and was Mayur's first as a screenwriter as well. Mere Yaar ki Shaadi Hai was produced by Yash Raj Films. He next worked as an associate director on Dhoom (2004), an action film which was a departure from the production house's usual romantic and family-oriented movies.

In 2004, Mayur left Yash Raj Films and worked as an independent screenwriter and lyricist. His first film as an independent was My Name is Anthony Gonsalves (2008), an adaptation of Julius Caesar). It released to a lukewarm response. His big break as a screenwriter came with Om Shanti Om (2007). The dialogues in Om Shanti Om achieved widespread public appreciation, with phrases 'Ek Chukti Sindoor' and 'Picture Abhi Baaki Hai Mere Dost' acquiring a cult status upon the film's release.

Next, Puri was the creative director for the animation film Jumbo (2008) produced by Percept Picture Company, with Akshay Kumar voicing the titular character. He co-wrote Blue (2009) which was the first Indian film to be shot extensively underwater in the Bahamas with top technicians from Hollywood. However, the film failed at the box office. Mayur then wrote the dialogues for Prince (2010), and also had a supporting role as P.K.

In 2009, Mayur took a sabbatical from Bollywood and founded a story-telling institute for young children called Story Circus and conducted a workshop for aspiring film-makers in Goa with the help of Goa University. While he was busy with his activities Beyond Bollywood, Mayur's next hit at the box-office came in 2011 with Remo D'Souza's directorial debut F.A.L.T.U (2011) - the screenplay and dialogues for which Mayur had written a few years back.

After one of the sessions in Story Circus, Mayur bumped into Farah Khan who had come to pick up her kids. While Mayur was still off Bollywood, Farah's Tees Maar Khan had released and she was starting to script her next project Happy New Year which she offered Mayur immediately. Also, around the same time, Pritam came back to Mayur and offered him to work on the songs of Race 2 (2013) and I Love New Year (2013). By 2012, Mayur returned to full-time writing with additional dialogue and lyrics of Remo D'Souza's next musical ABCD: Any Body Can Dance (2013). For this film's songs, Mayur collaborated with music director duo - Sachin-Jigar. In 2013, he wrote 26 songs as a lyricist.

Happy New Year released in 2014, the dialogues of the film written by Mayur being well received. Apart from this, Mayur worked on the script of ABCD: Any Body Can Dance 2 (2015). His recent releases as a lyricist are Humshakals, Entertainment, Kick, All is Well and ABCD: Any Body Can Dance 2.

In a TV Interview with Komal Nahata, it was indicated that Mayur is working on his directorial debut film which will be announced soon.

Film songwriter
As a songwriter, Mayur has closely worked with composer Pritam on the albums for Race 2 (2013), Singh Is Kinng (2009)  and Pyaar Ke Side Effects (2006), Chocolate, Garam Masala, Pyaar Ke Side Effects, Fight Club – Members Only, Singh Is Kinng, Jannat 2, Race 2, Shaadi Ke Side Effects. The latest release is 'Selfie Le Le Re' from Bajrangi Bhaijaan (2015) starring Salman Khan.

According to a Times Poll, "Be Intehaan" from the movie Race 2 was ranked as the 7th most Romantic songs of 2013.

Mayur also worked with A. R. Rahman on the songs "Aaj Dil Gustakh Hai" for Blue and "Alive" (Hindi version - Zindagi) for 'Provoked'.

Mayur has collaborated with music directors Sachin–Jigar on ABCD (2013), ABCD 2 (2015) and revamped Zoom (TV channel)'s song called "Turn On" and with Himesh Reshammiya on Kick.

Film director
Mayur recently directed Firdaws (2017), his first short film that has been doing festival rounds and has been the official selection in over 36 international festivals. Mayur has won 16 International Awards for Firdaws.

Ahmedabad Theatre, Commercials, TV shows (including 'DharmYuddh') which was the first Gujarati daily soap (edited and wrote also).

MUMBAI: Tere Liye was the first Hindi Film Mayur started to work as a First Assistant Director. It marked the launch of the Music duos Jeet-Pritam who are now working as independent music composers. The film was entirely shot in Ramoji Rao Filmcity (Hyderabad).

Mere Yaar ki Shaadi Hai was Mayur's first break as a screenwriter. He was also the Chief Assistant Director on the film. It was a light-hearted Romantic Family Drama that was received very well.

Mayur worked as the Associate Director on the first instalment of Dhoom.

Mayur then went on to be a Creative Director on an Animation film Jumbo starring Voice of Akshay Kumar, produced by Percept Picture Company

Beyond Bollywood

Story Circus - In 2010, Mayur founded a theatre production group that creates live theatre and storytelling productions for educational institutions, corporates, and theatre enthusiasts. Read more about Story Circus here.

FilmGoa

In 2011, Mayur started an initiative called FilmGoa - an effort to decentralize the mainstream film-making in India. It aimed to provide training and job support to aspiring film-makers and to facilitate film making activities in Goa. Mayur went on to give orientation lectures in more than 30 colleges in Goa, interacting with over 6000 students during this year long event. Out of hundreds of applicants from all over the country, 85 promising ones were chosen for a yearlong workshop, hosted by Goa University and Goa Tourism Development Corporation.

Mayur also undertakes Corporate Workshops for Middle and Upper Management, the sessions usually focus on creating ‘Brand Ambassadors through Broadcast and Social Media Content’ and ‘Decoding Creativity at Workplace. His clients include Radio Mirchi and Viacom.

Awards and nominations

Filmography

References

External links
 
 

Living people
Year of birth missing (living people)
Indian screenwriters
Indian male actors